At , War Down is one of the highest hills in the county of Hampshire, England and the second highest summit in the Hampshire part of the South Downs. Just 1 kilometre to the northwest is the South Downs' highest point at Butser Hill (270 m).

Much of the hill is covered in mixed forest and there is a trig point at 244 metres. There is a forest track over the summit. It is located in the Queen Elizabeth Country Park.

References 

Hills of Hampshire